Marcelo Adrián Pugliese (born 2 September 1968 in Buenos Aires) is an Argentine discus thrower. His personal best throw is 64.23 metres, achieved in April 2002 in Mar del Plata.

He became South American champion in 1999, 2001 and 2003. He also competed at the Olympic Games in 1996, 2000 and 2004 as well as the World Championships in 1997 and 2001 without qualifying for the final round.

In March 2007 Pugliese was found guilty of stanozolol doping. The sample was delivered on 27 May 2006 in an in-competition test. He received a suspension from July 2006 to July 2008.

Achievements

See also
List of sportspeople sanctioned for doping offences

References

External links

1968 births
Living people
Argentine male discus throwers
Athletes (track and field) at the 1996 Summer Olympics
Athletes (track and field) at the 2000 Summer Olympics
Athletes (track and field) at the 2004 Summer Olympics
Athletes (track and field) at the 1991 Pan American Games
Athletes (track and field) at the 1995 Pan American Games
Athletes (track and field) at the 1999 Pan American Games
Athletes (track and field) at the 2003 Pan American Games
Olympic athletes of Argentina
Doping cases in athletics
Argentine sportspeople in doping cases
Athletes from Buenos Aires
South American Games gold medalists for Argentina
South American Games silver medalists for Argentina
South American Games bronze medalists for Argentina
South American Games medalists in athletics
Competitors at the 1990 South American Games
Competitors at the 1994 South American Games
Competitors at the 1998 South American Games
Pan American Games competitors for Argentina
20th-century Argentine people
21st-century Argentine people